Adelaide of Holstein-Rendsburg (died January 1350), Countess of Schauenburg, was the daughter of Count Henry I and his wife, Helwig of Bronckhorst. One source gives her birthdate as 1299 in Rendsburg, Rendsburg-Eckernforde, Schleswig-Holstein, Germany.

In 1313, Adelaide married Duke Eric II of Schleswig (1288-1325).  They had two children:

 Valdemar III (1314–1364), King of Denmark 1326–1329, Duke of Schleswig as Valdemar V 1325–1326 and 1330–1364.
 Helvig of Schleswig (d. 1374), married Valdemar IV, King of Denmark

Both her son and her son-in-law became King of Denmark.

References

Year of birth unknown
1350 deaths
German countesses
German duchesses
House of Schauenburg
Daughters of monarchs